The Septembers of Shiraz (2007) is a debut novel by Iranian American author Dalia Sofer.

It narrates the lives of a well-to-do Iranian family during and after the Iranian revolution which additionally overthrew the Shah and ushered in the Islamic republic. There is also a subplot involving a Hasidic family in New York.

The book's new cover is designed by Claire Vaccaro.

Awards and honors
2007 New York Times Notable Book of the Year
2007 National Jewish Book Award, finalist
2008 PEN/Robert W. Bingham Prize, winner
2008 Orange Prize, longlist
2009 International Dublin Literary Award, longlist
2009 Sami Rohr Prize for Jewish Literature Choice Award, winner

Notes 
 In 2009, the novel was selected for the eighth annual Austin, Texas, Mayor's Book Club challenge – "an annual citywide reading campaign to develop a community experience through reading and discussion of shared books."

References

External links 

'Septembers of Shiraz' a First Novel, Set in Tehran book review on All Things Considered from NPR
A Tale of Terror in Iran book review from The Wall Street Journal
Iranian riches, rags, and carpets book review from The Christian Science Monitor
Lost in Tehran book review from The New York Times

Iranian novels
Novels set in the Iranian Revolution
2007 American novels
2007 debut novels